Neve Eitan (lit. Strong residence) is a kibbutz in the Beit She'an Valley in northern Israel. Located about 1 km east of Beit She'an and 1 km west of Maoz Haim, it is under the jurisdiction of Valley of Springs Regional Council.

History
The kibbutz was established on 25 November 1938 by Polish members of the "Akiva" movement as part of the tower and stockade campaign. Native Israelis joined the settlement in 1952. 

The name "Neve Eitan" is based on the original Hebrew text of a verse in Jeremiah (Jeremiah, 49:19), in which God curses Edom to sudden overthrow: "It shall be as when a lion comes up out of the jungle of the Jordan (Ge'on HaYarden: גְּאֹ֣ון הַיַּרְדֵּן֮) against a secure pasture (Neve Eitan: נְוֵ֣ה אֵיתָן֒)" (JPS1985). 

Neve Eitan was established on what was traditionally land belonging to the Palestinian village of Al-Ghazzawiyya.

Education
The kibbutz is home to the "Ge'on HaYarden" (lit. Pride of the Jordan) high school, which has more than 500 pupils.
A failed attempt to build an external addition to the kibbutz area has brought a big group of families to the place, most of which are home-schoolers. With over 20 eco-unschooling families, Neve-Eitan has the largest community of home-schoolers in Israel.

Notable people

Shmuel Yanai, commander of the Israeli Sea Corps

References

Kibbutzim
Kibbutz Movement
Populated places established in 1938
Populated places in Northern District (Israel)
Polish-Jewish culture in Israel
1938 establishments in Mandatory Palestine